Dichomitus is a genus of poroid crust fungi in the family Polyporaceae. It was circumscribed by English mycologist Derek Reid in 1965.

Description
Dichomitus fungi have fruit bodies that are either crust-like, or form caps that largely lack a stipe. The upper surface of the fruit body is typically white to blackish in colour, while the pore surface ranges from cream to pale greyish. The inner tissue of the fruit body, the context, is white to cream.

Dichomitus features a dimitic hyphal system (containing both generative and skeletal hyphae).

Species

, Index Fungorum accepts 24 species of Dichomitus:
Dichomitus affixus (Corner) T.Hatt. (2002)
Dichomitus amazonicus Gomes-Silva, Ryvarden & Gibertoni (2012) – Brazil
Dichomitus amygdalinus (Berk. & Ravenel) Ryvarden (1977)
Dichomitus anoectoporus (Berk. & M.A.Curtis) Ryvarden (1984)
Dichomitus campestris (Quél.) Domanski & Orlicz (1966) – Europe
Dichomitus citricremeus Masuka & Ryvarden (1999) – Africa
Dichomitus costaricensis Ryvarden (2013) – Costa Rica
Dichomitus cylindrosporus Ryvarden (2007) – Belize
Dichomitus deviatus Ipulet & Ryvarden (2005) – Africa
Dichomitus ecuadorensis Ryvarden (2010)
Dichomitus efibulatus A.M.Ainsw. & Ryvarden (2008) – Great Britain
Dichomitus epitephrus (Berk.) Ryvarden (1984)
Dichomitus eucalypti Ryvarden (1985) – Australia
Dichomitus grandisporus Aime & Ryvarden (2007) – Guyana
Dichomitus hubeiensis Hai J.Li & B.K.Cui (2013) – China
Dichomitus kirkii Masuka & Ryvarden (1999) – Africa; China
Dichomitus leucoplacus (Berk.) Ryvarden (1977)
Dichomitus mexicanus (Ryvarden) Ryvarden (2007)
Dichomitus newhookii P.K.Buchanan & Ryvarden (2000) – New Zealand
Dichomitus papuanus Quanten (1996) – Papua New Guinea
Dichomitus pendulus Læssøe & Ryvarden (2010)
Dichomitus perennis Ryvarden (2007) – Belize
Dichomitus sinuolatus H.S.Yuan (2013) – China
Dichomitus squalens (P.Karst.) D.A.Reid (1965) – Europe; Canada

References

Polyporaceae
Polyporales genera
Taxa described in 1965
Taxa named by Derek Reid